The London Intermediate Football Championship is a Gaelic Athletic Association cup competition between the second tier Gaelic football clubs in London, England, organised by London GAA. The 2019 competition, formally known for sponsorship reasons as the VGC Intermediate Championship, was won by Thomas McCurtains who beat Tir Chonaill Gaels (Homegrown) on 29 September 2019 by 0–10 to 0-07

Honours

		          
Disbanded and later became North London Shamrocks
(r): Score in replay of drawn match

References

 

Intermediate Championship
Intermediate Gaelic football county championships